Almondbank railway station served the village of Almondbank, in the Scottish county of Perth and Kinross.

History

Opened on 1 January 1858 by the Perth, Almond Valley and Methven Railway, later absorbed by the Caledonian Railway, it became part of the London, Midland and Scottish Railway during the Grouping of 1923. Passing on to the Scottish Region of British Railways on nationalisation in 1948, it was then closed to passenger traffic by the British Railways Board on 1 October 1951.  The station remained open to goods traffic, servicing the local Royal Naval Workshops which had its own small branch line, connecting the site to the station.  Almondbank Station was finally closed to goods traffic with the closure of the entire Perth to Crieff line on 25 January 1964.

Now a private dwelling house, the former station house is located adjacent to the A85 road bridge over the now filled in course of the railway, but a cutting on the north east side of the bridge is still clearly visible.

References

 
 
 
 Station on navigable O.S. map

External links
 Disused stations

Disused railway stations in Perth and Kinross
Railway stations in Great Britain opened in 1858
Railway stations in Great Britain closed in 1951
1858 establishments in Scotland
1951 disestablishments in Scotland
Former Caledonian Railway stations